Neža Klančar (born 19 February 2000) is a Slovenian swimmer. She represented Slovenia at the 2019 World Aquatics Championships held in Gwangju, South Korea. She competed in the women's 50 metre freestyle and women's 100 metre freestyle events. In both events she did not advance to compete in the semi-finals. She also competed in the women's 200 metre individual medley where she also did not advance to compete in the semi-finals.

References

External links
 

2000 births
Living people
Slovenian female swimmers
Place of birth missing (living people)
European Games competitors for Slovenia
Swimmers at the 2015 European Games
Swimmers at the 2018 Mediterranean Games
Swimmers at the 2022 Mediterranean Games
Mediterranean Games medalists in swimming
Mediterranean Games gold medalists for Slovenia
Mediterranean Games silver medalists for Slovenia
Mediterranean Games bronze medalists for Slovenia
Swimmers at the 2018 Summer Youth Olympics
21st-century Slovenian women